The Matthews (or Mathews) Range, also known as the Lenkiyio Hills, is a range of mountains in Kenya, Africa.

History

Originally gazetted in 1956, the Matthews Range was designated in 1964 as a forest reserve status.

In 1995, a Trust was formed by the Samburu tribes to preserve the Namunyak Wildlife Conservacy, which remains one of the most successful community conservation programs in Kenya.

Geography
The range is about 150 km long, oriented north–south. It is located in the Laikipia district of the Rift Valley Province in northern Kenya. The town of Wamba lies at the southeastern edge of the range.

Peaks
There is also a breast-shaped hill locally known as Sweet Sixteen in the range.
Oldoinyo Sabachi, 
Lekat, 
Namanyaraboo,

Ecology 

The area is isolated, and holds forests of juniper and cycads.  It is home to elephants and other large mammals, and was one of the last places in northern Kenya to have wild Black Rhinos. The last Black Rhino in the Mathew's was poached out in the 1990s. The Mathew's are also home to the Samburu people. The mountain range is a sky island: surrounded by plains, with Ndoto Mountains to the north and the Karisia hills to the west. A number of the species in the Mathew's have evolved independently and the diversity of the forest is of great conservation value. Part has been designated as a wildlife sanctuary.

References 

Mountain ranges of Kenya